Dennis Wolf Bushyhead (Cherokee, March 18, 1826 – February 4, 1898) was a leader in the Cherokee Nation after they had removed to Indian Territory. Born into the Wolf Clan, he was elected as Principal Chief, serving two terms, from 1879 to 1887.

Biography
Dennis Wolf Bushyhead was born on Mouse Creek near present-day Cleveland, Tennessee, in the eastern part of the state. He was the oldest son of Rev. Jesse Bushyhead, whose Cherokee name was Unaduti. His mother Eliza Wilkinson of the Wolf Clan was from Georgia (U.S. state). She was his father's second wife. Both parents were of mixed-race ancestry and identified as Cherokee.

Also known as Unadena, meaning "woolly head" in Cherokee, the boy Jesse was reared in his parents' Cherokee culture. He started school in 1833 at Candy Creek Mission, Tennessee, under the charge of Rev. Holland. In 1835 he went to the Mission School at Valley River in North Carolina and remained there for one year, where he was taught by Evan Jones, a noted Baptist minister and close associate of his father. Bushyhead was a supporter of the Chief John Ross faction, when the tribe was divided by opinions about making a treaty to cede land and move west of the Mississippi River, as was being urged by the federal government.

In 1838 as part of Indian Removal, Rev. Jesse Bushyhead conducted a detachment of Cherokee, numbering nearly 1000 people from the old nation, to Beattie's Prairie in the Delaware District (Indian Territory) as part of Indian Removal from the Southeast. His son Dennis was among the party. In the following year, the boy attended Mission School at Park Hill, Cherokee Nation, overseen by Rev. Samuel A. Worcester. He studied there for one year. In 1841 his father sent Dennis to college (more similar to a seminary or prep school) at what is now known as the Lawrenceville School in Lawrenceville, New Jersey. In March 1841 Bushyead was invited to join Chief Ross' delegation to Washington, D.C. to attend the inauguration of General William Henry Harrison as President of The United States.

Bushyhead studied in New Jersey for three years, completing his education at Lawrenceville in July 1844. He was enrolled in the sophomore class at Princeton University when he learned that his father had died and he had to return to the Cherokee Nation.

In October 1844 Bushyhead started work as a clerk for Lewis Ross, brother of Chief John Ross, serving until  the summer of 1847. He was elected as clerk for the Cherokee Senate in October 1847, serving for one year.

In November 1871 Bushyhead was elected as treasurer of the Cherokee nation and held the position for a full term of four years. He was reelected to the post in 1875.

In 1879 Bushyhead was elected as the Principal Chief of the Cherokee Nation. He served from 1879 to 1887. During this period, in 1883 he vetoed a bill by the Cherokee Senate to exclude Cherokee Freedmen from sharing in the proceeds of additional compensation by the federal government for payment of the Cherokee Outlet. He reminded them of the terms of the 1866 treaty with the United States after the Civil War, by which Freedmen who remained in the Nation were to have full citizenship rights forever. The US authorized an additional $300,000 that year. The Cherokee National Council overrode Bushyhead's veto, setting up discrimination against the Freedmen that has haunted relations among tribal members into the 21st century. He also dealt with issues of railroad rights-of-way, land allotment under the Dawes Act, education, white intruders, tribal citizenship, and grazing rights.

Family life
On September 6, 1869, Bushyhead married a widow, Elizabeth Alabama Adair, née Schrimsher, from Fort Gibson. She was a daughter of John G. Scrimscher and his wife. They had four children together: Jesse Crary (1870–1942), Mary Elizabeth (1873–1930), Sarah Catherine (1876–1908), and Dennis Bushyhead, Jr. (1880–1961).  His wife died on October 30, 1882.

On October 31, 1883, he married Eloise Perry Butler (1859–1940), a niece of a U.S. Senator. She helped raise the four young children from his first wife, and the couple had two children of their own: James Butler (1884–1965) and Frances Taylor Bushyhead (1887–1929).

Death
Dennis Bushyhead died February 4, 1898, in Tahlequah, the capital of the Cherokee Nation, and was buried in the Tahlequah City Cemetery.

Legacy and honors
Bushyhead, Oklahoma, was named after the principal chief. It is a small rural community in Rogers County, Oklahoma.

Sources

Further reading
 Harold Keith, "Problems of a Cherokee Principal Chief," The Chronicles of Oklahoma 17 (September 1939).
 John Bartlett Meserve, "Chief Dennis Wolfe Bushyhead," The Chronicles of Oklahoma 14 (September 1936).
 H. Craig Miner, "Dennis Bushyhead," in American Indian Leaders: Studies in Diversity, ed. R. David Edmunds (Lincoln: University of Nebraska Press, 1980). 
 "The Indian Territory, Its Chiefs, Legislators and Leading Men", Native American Nations website
 J.S. Murrow, The Rev. Jesse Bushyhead: Cherokee Indian and Missionary,   2015, .

External links
 Encyclopedia of Oklahoma History and Culture - Bushyhead, Dennis

1826 births
1898 deaths
People of Indian Territory
Pre-statehood history of Oklahoma
Lawrenceville School alumni
Native American Christians
People from Bradley County, Tennessee
Principal Chiefs of the Cherokee Nation (1794–1907)
19th-century Native Americans